Podocarpus pilgeri is a species of conifer in the family Podocarpaceae. It is a small to medium-sized tree that is found in India and Bangladesh, Indochina and Malay Archipelago. Its timber is hard and water-resistant.

Podocarpus wangii of southern China is often treated as synonym of P. pilgeri.

References

pilgeri
Trees of China
Flora of tropical Asia
Least concern plants
Taxonomy articles created by Polbot